Nudo or  NUDO may refer to:

People
 Gene Nudo (born 1958), American American football coach
 Vince Nudo, Canadian musician
 , Italian actor

Places
 Col Nudo, Italy
 Monte Nudo, Italy
 
 Nudo, Nikšić, Montenegro
 Nudo de los Pastos, Ecuador

Other
 El nudo, Spanish series
 National Unity Democratic Organisation
 Nudo Bombers
 Po Nudo, Star Wars character